Rincón de Los Sauces Airport is a public use airport on the east side of Rincón de los Sauces, a town in the Neuquén Province of Argentina.

See also

Transport in Argentina
List of airports in Argentina

References

External links 
OpenStreetMap - Rincón de los Sauces
Our Airports - Rincon De Los Sauces Airport

Airports in Argentina
Neuquén Province